Apostrophe Island is a small ice-covered island lying close off Spatulate Ridge in Lady Newnes Bay, Victoria Land. The name is descriptive of the appearance of the island in plan and was given by the New Zealand Antarctic Place-Names Committee in 1966.

See also 
 List of antarctic and sub-antarctic islands

References
 

Islands of Victoria Land
Borchgrevink Coast